Llyn Cerrig Bach Plaque is a bronze plaque that dates from 200BC to AD100 in the Iron Age, found at Llyn Cerrig Bach.

The plaque is a decorative sheet bronze mount of insular La Tène design which may have been used to decorate a shield.

History 
The Llyn Cerrig Bach Plaque is a bronze plaque which may have been used to decorate a shield. that dates between 200BC and AD100. It was thrown into Llyn Cerrig Bach, Anglesey. The three legged triskele symbol, which may be inspired by a puffin, and also referred to as a trumpet motif, could represent the living, the dead and the gods or the cycle of birth life and death.

Others believe the triskele symbol on the plaque to represent earth, wind and water. The pattern has been beaten from the reverse skillfully and it may have been placed on a chariot, shield or musical instrument in the Iron Age. 

Amgueddfa Cymru's, Dr Mark Redknap stated that the plaque is "widely recognised to be of profound ‘dynamic character and significance’ for understanding Early Celtic art in Britain". The plaque is one of the most significant of 181 pieces of insular La Tène metalwork discovered in Llyn Cerrig Bach that were found during the construction of RAF Valley in 1942 as a result of peat extraction. 

John Creighton suggests that druids may have influenced artistic design and on coins, demonstrating their expressive power and authority, with the Llyn Cerrig Bach plaque being an example of this.

Llyn Cerrig Bach finds were displayed at Oriel Ynys Môn in Llangefni from July 14 until November 11 in 2012.

See also 

 Archaeology of Wales
 Celtic Britons
 Celtic art

References

Bibliography 

 
 
 
 
 
 
 
 
 
 

Welsh art
Welsh artefacts
Iron Age Wales
Celtic art
Collections of Amgueddfa Cymru – Museum Wales